Progress is the 13th studio album by the Japanese hard rock band Show-Ya. It was released on 30 September 2015. The album includes two new versions of the 1989 hit single "Genkai Lovers", one featuring Japanese celebrity Namie Amuro.

Track listing
"Genkai Lovers 2015" (限界 Lovers 2015) (Keiko Terada & Miki Igarashi, Yoshihiko Andō) – 4:31
"Byōsatsu Crazy Love" (秒殺Crazy Love) (Terada, Yukinojō Mori) – 4:15
"Hangyaku no Flash" (反逆のフラッシュ) (Terada, Mori) – 3:54
"Bring It Out!" (Miki Nakamura, Mori) – 4:58
"Always on Your Side" (Terada, Marcy & Terada) – 5:34
"Rock Love" (Terada, Yasushi Akimoto) – 3:42
"Medusa" (Satomi Senba & Miki Tsunoda, Mori) – 3:38
"A View After Dark" (Terada) – 4:18
"Sign" (Terada, Mori) – 3:56
"Show–yA" (Igarashi) – 5:42
"Kagirinaku Haruka na Jiyū E - Go Again" (限りなくはるかな自由へ~go again~) (Igarashi, Terada) – 7:16
"Genkai Lovers" (限界 Lovers) (Terada & Igarashi, Andō) – 4:07 (featuring Namie Amuro)

Personnel

Band members
Keiko Terada – vocals
Miki Igarashi – guitars
Miki Nakamura – keyboards
Satomi Senba – bass
Miki Tsunoda – drums

References

2015 albums
Show-Ya albums
Japanese-language albums